Azamara is a cruise line based in Miami, Florida, that operates four cruise ships on worldwide itineraries.

History
Azamara Cruises was founded in 2007 after two R-class ships from Pullmantur Cruises that would have gone to Celebrity Cruises were transferred to the new company. The first ships of the company were the Azamara Quest and Azamara Journey. They make cruises to exotic locations, competing with Oceania Cruises.

Azamara became quite famous and in 2009 underwent a rebranding, being renamed to Azamara Club Cruises. Between 2012 and 2013 the Azamara Quest and Azamara Journey were renovated and in 2018 the company acquired the Adonia from P&O Cruises, renaming it to Azamara Pursuit.

The company was founded by Royal Caribbean who wanted to diversify its operations. In 2021, due to the COVID-19 pandemic, the company was sold to a private investment group.

The ships were extensively renovated from 2012 to 2013 and 2018, respectively.

Azamara currently operates four ships. They belong to the eight R-class ships that were built for Renaissance Cruises between 1997 and 2001. The Azamara Quest and Azamara Journey both entered service in 2000 under the original names R Six and R Seven. In March 2018, Adonia was also taken over from P&O Cruises and renamed Azamara Pursuit.

Each of the ships can carry a maximum of 686 passengers. All ships sail under the flag of Malta. Azamara offers cruises with the ships worldwide.

In January 2021, Royal Caribbean announced that it would sell Azamara to Sycamore Partners in the first quarter of 2021. The sale was completed in March 2021. The acquisition of another ship, the Pacific Princess, a sister ship to the other ships in the fleet, was also announced. It was handed over in March 2021 and was officially renamed Azamara Onward on May 2, 2022.

Fleet 
The Azamara ships were built in 1999–2001 for Renaissance Cruises as a part of their .

References

External links

Official website

Cruise lines
Transport companies established in 2007
2021 mergers and acquisitions